In the 1962–63 season, USM Alger is competing in the Championnat National for the 1st season, as well as the Algerian Cup. They will be competing in Championnat National, and the Algerian Cup.

Summary season

football competitions come to life in the country. Given the geographical distribution of the clubs throughout the country, formerly divided into three departments under the French colonial administration, each league took over the organization of the competitions in an autonomous way, encouraged by the Ministry of Sports and Youth. In the early years, the competitions thus restarted in the form of regional criteria at the end of which were sacred the departmental champions who were then to compete in the form of tournaments "play off" to designate the Champion of Algeria. League beginning with the first post-independence the USM Alger administration to bring the former Nice and Monaco player Abdelaziz Ben Tifour to be a coach and a player at the same time, also included one foreign player Freddy Zemmour from Pied-Noir one of the few French players who have decided to stay in Algeria. USM Alger took place in Group V and took first place with 51 points and strongest offensive line in each league with 75 goal after the piece and in Algiers League in a group with MC Alger, AS Orléansville, NA Hussein Dey and OM Saint Eugène took first place also with 12 points from 12 to advance to the semi-finals and play against Hamra Annaba previously USM Annaba and won by corners 7–6 qualify for the final of the first tournament in the history of Algeria, and find MC Alger again The Red and Black, led by player-coach Bentifour easily outweigh the score of 3–0 in a match played at the Stade d'El Annasser, in the presence of President Ahmed Ben Bella and Minister of Defense Houari Boumedienne. From here Sostara was honored to be the first club to win the championship title in the era of independence.

Pre-season and friendlies

Non-competitive

Overview

Critériums d'Honneur

League table

Results by round

Matches

Final Groups

Algiers

P = Matches played; W = Matches won; D = Matches drawn; L = Matches lost; F = Goals for; A = Goals against; GD = Goal difference; Pts = Points

Final tournament

Algerian Cup

Squad information

Playing statistics

Goalscorers
Includes all competitive matches. The list is sorted alphabetically by surname when total goals are equal.

Squad list
Players and squad numbers last updated on 1 September 1970.Note: Flags indicate national team as has been defined under FIFA eligibility rules. Players may hold more than one non-FIFA nationality.

References

USM Alger seasons
Algerian football clubs 1962–63 season